Al-Jāmiʿah al-Qurʼāniyyah al-ʿArabiyyah Lālbāgh, better known simply as Lalbagh Madrasah, is a Qawmi madrasa providing higher Islamic studies in Dhaka, Bangladesh. It has seven education sections from kindergarten to post-graduate levels.

History
This institute was founded by a group of Islamic scholars led by Zafar Ahmad Usmani, Shamsul Haque Faridpuri, Deen Muhammad Khan and Hafezzi Huzur. They planned for the establishment of this seminary around the historic Lalbagh Fort in Shawwal 1370 H (1950 CE). Hafezzi Huzur was the first person who started the class of memorizing the Quran (hifz) amid a lot of difficulties and problems. However, due to the effort of those personalities, the madrasa has now become well known internationally. Jamiah Lalbagh looks after around 70 madrasahs of this area so that they can improve their curricular activities.

Library and publications
 The University Library has a large stock of  books of Islamic history, Islamic Philosophy, text books of different levels, Journals, Magazines etc. in Arabic, Bengali, Urdu, Persian and English languages. The approximate number of books in this library is about 22,000.
 Fatwa-E-Jamia: The Madrasah has responsibilities for issues of society. It gives accurate advice and legal opinions for those issues the aggregate of which are published as a book called Fatwa-e-Jamiah. Currently 12 volumes have been published.

Facilities
All the students are residents of the madrasah. The Jamiah gives free education to all students. It also lends them textbooks. Those students who attain an excellent result in the examination are rewarded. Moreover, the Jamiah provides orphans and poor and distressed students with food and accommodation.

Alumni
Abu Taher Misbah

References

External links 
 Jamia Rahmania Arabia Dhaka

Mosques in Dhaka
Qawmi madrasas of Bangladesh
Deobandi Islamic universities and colleges
1950 establishments in East Pakistan